U-124 may refer to one of the following German submarines:

 , a Type UE II submarine launched in 1918 and that served in World War I until surrendered on 1 December 1918; broken up at Swansea in 1922
 During World War I, Germany also had this submarine with a similar name:
 , a Type UB III submarine launched in 1918 and sunk on 20 July 1918
 , a Type IXB submarine that served in World War II until sunk on 2 April 1943

Submarines of Germany